The Statue of Liberty is a 1985 American documentary film on the history of the Statue of Liberty (Liberty Enlightening the World). It was produced and directed by Ken Burns. The film, which first aired in October 1985, was narrated by historian David McCullough.

Contributors
The film includes readings by Jeremy Irons and Arthur Miller, among others. McCullough, then-New York Gov. Mario Cuomo,  former congresswoman Barbara Jordan, director Miloš Forman, writers James Baldwin and Jerzy Kosinski, historian Vartan Gregorian, musician Ray Charles, and poet Carolyn Forché are among those interviewed.

Paul Simon's song "American Tune" is heard at the beginning and end of the film. Also included are vintage clips dealing with the Statue of Liberty from the films The Immigrant (1917), Mr. Smith Goes to Washington (1939), Anything Can Happen (1952), and Planet of the Apes (1968).

Accolades
The film was nominated for an Academy Award for Best Documentary Feature.

References

External links
Official site on PBS
The Statue of Liberty at KenBurns.com

Ken Burns discusses his documentary on the Statue of Liberty - EMMYTVLEGENDS.ORG-YouTube

1985 films
American documentary television films
Films directed by Ken Burns
Statue of Liberty
Documentary films about New York City
Documentary films about immigration to the United States
1980s English-language films
1980s American films